William Lee "Monk" Younger (November 16, 1894 – June 30, 1977) was an American football player, coach of football, basketball, and baseball, and college athletics administrator.  He played college football at Davidson College in 1915 and at Virginia Polytechnic Institute and State University in 1916 and 1917. He was elected captain of the 1918 VPI team, but did not play for the Gobblers because he was serving in France during the close of World War I. 

Younger was the head football coach at Hampden–Sydney College in 1919 and at Davidson from 1923 to 1931, compiling a career college football coaching record of 49–40–8.  He was also the head basketball coach at Hampden–Sydney (1919–1920), Virginia Tech (1920–1923, 1932–1937), and Davidson (1923–1931), tallying a career college basketball mark of 157–159.  In addition, he was the head baseball coach at Virginia Tech from 1921 to 1923 and at Davidson from 1924 to 1931, amassing  career college baseball mark of 82–110–4.  Younger was appointed as the athletic director of Virginia Tech in 1935 and served in that post until his retirement in 1950. He was elected to the Virginia Tech Sports Hall of Fame in 1984. 

He died after a long illness on June 30, 1977 at a hospital in Blacksburg, Virginia.

Head coaching record

Football

References

External links
 Virginia Sports Hall of Fame profile
 

1894 births
1977 deaths
American football ends
American men's basketball coaches
Basketball coaches from Virginia
Davidson Wildcats athletic directors
Davidson Wildcats baseball coaches
Davidson Wildcats football coaches
Davidson Wildcats football players
Davidson Wildcats men's basketball coaches
Hampden–Sydney Tigers athletic directors
Hampden–Sydney Tigers football coaches
Hampden–Sydney Tigers basketball coaches
Players of American football from Virginia
Sportspeople from Danville, Virginia
Sportspeople from Lynchburg, Virginia
Virginia Tech Hokies athletic directors
Virginia Tech Hokies baseball coaches
Virginia Tech Hokies football coaches
Virginia Tech Hokies football players
Virginia Tech Hokies men's basketball coaches